Pat McFadden may refer to:

 Pat McFadden (born 1965), Labour MP
 Patrick McFadden, Irish Cumann na nGaedheal politician 1923–1927
 Patricia McFadden (born 1952), Swazi radical feminist